Basīṭ, or al-basīṭ (البسيط), is a metre used in classical Arabic poetry. The word literally means "extended" or "spread out" in Arabic. Along with the ṭawīl, kāmil, and wāfir, it is one of the four most common metres used in pre-Islamic and classical Arabic poetry.

Form of the metre

| x – u – | x u – | – – u – | u u – |

The mnemonic words (tafāʿīl) used by Arab prosodists to describe this metre are: .

The metre is usually used in couplets of eight feet each.

Example
An example is the qasīda by al-Mutanabbi (915-965): “The poet reproaches Sayf al-Dawla” (king of Aleppo), a poem of 38 couplets, from which comes the well-known verse:

| u – u – | u u – | – – u – | u u – |
| u – u – | – u – | – – u – | u u – |

"If you see the lion’s fangs displayed,
do not imagine for a moment that the lion is smiling."

Variations
Although in the poem of al-Mutanabbi quoted above, the last foot of each half-verse is always | u u – |, other poets use the metre in the following form, where "uu" represents a biceps element, i.e. one where the two short syllables can optionally be replaced by one long one. 
| x – u – | x u – | – – u – | uu – |

An example is the following drinking-song by Abu Nuwas which begins:

| – – u – | – u – | – – u – | – – |
| u – u – | – u – | – – u – | – – |

"Censure me not, for censure but tempts me; 
cure me rather with the cause of my ill—"

The metre also exists in a trimeter form of which the half-verse is as follows:
| x – u – | – u – | x – u – |

There is also a catalectic trimeter form:
| x – u – | – u – | x – – |

Occasionally the first foot of each half-verse can be | – u u – |.

Very rarely (in less than 1% of lines) the third foot can be | u – u – |.

In a musical context
The term basīṭ is also used in a musical context; in the Andalusi nubah, or classical suites, of Morocco, each nubah, or suite, is divided into five main movements (called mīzān (plural: mawāzīn)) each of which uses a different rhythm, as follows:

Basīṭ (6/4)
Qāim wa nusf (8/4)
Btāyhī (8/4)
Darj (4/4)
Quddām (3/4 or 6/8)

See also
Arabic prosody
Tawil

References

External links
A recitation in Arabic of al-Mutanabbi's line
Recitation of the Abu Nuwas poem by Bashar Al-Roumi 
Version of the Abu Nuwas poem sung to a lute

Arabic and Central Asian poetics
Poetic rhythm
Arabic music
Arabic poetry
Arabic poetry forms